La Rochette is the name of several communes:

France
 La Rochette, Alpes-de-Haute-Provence
 La Rochette, Ardèche
 La Rochette, Charente
 La Rochette, Hautes-Alpes
 La Rochette, Savoie
 La Rochette, Seine-et-Marne

Luxembourg
 Larochette, in the canton of Mersch

See also 
France
 La Croix-de-la-Rochette, in the Savoie département
 La Rochette-du-Buis, in the Drôme département
 Saint-Médard-la-Rochette, in the Creuse département
 Thoré-la-Rochette, in the Loir-et-Cher département
 Vaunaveys-la-Rochette, in the Drôme département